The 1973 Sandown 250 was an endurance race for Group C Touring Cars. The race was Round 2 of the 1973 Australian Manufacturers' Championship and was the eighth in a sequence of annual endurance races now known as the Sandown 500.

The race was won by Peter Brock driving a Holden Torana GTR XU-1.

Results

References

External links
 1973 Touring Car images including Sandown 250, autopics.com.au

Motorsport at Sandown
Sandown 250
Pre-Bathurst 500